Floriade 1972 was a garden festival held in Amsterdam, Netherlands following its recognition by the Bureau International des Expositions (BIE). The 1972 exposition was the fifth edition of the international horticultural exposition organised under the auspices of the Association of International Horticultural Producers (AIPH) and the second Floriade in the Netherlands. The first Amsterdam Floriade lasted from March 30 to October 1, 1972.

The exposition was held at the newly created Amstelpark and Beatrix Park. The landscaped grounds at Amstelpark covered 700.000m². Beatrix Park, part of the Amsterdam RAI Exhibition and Convention Centre and a portion of the embankment on which later the ring road south and the Amsterdam RAI railway station were built, was part of the Floriade. The sites were connected by a cable car and carts. A narrow gauge railway and Ferris wheel were also built at Amstelpark.

After the closure of the Floriade, much of the amenities that were built for the event remained at Amstelpark. These included the Amstel train (a narrow-gauge railway ), a maze, a rose garden, an orangery, the Glass House, greenhouses, a miniature golf course, the Rhododendron Valley, The Abandoned land, Galerie Papillon Park and a large playground for children.

External links

 Official website of the BIE

International horticultural exhibitions
1972 in the Netherlands
Events in Amsterdam
Festivals in the Netherlands
Garden festivals in the Netherlands
1972 festivals
Floriade (Netherlands)
1970s in Amsterdam